Alone in the World is an 1881 Oil-on-canvas painting by Dutch artist Jozef Israëls. The subject of the painting is isolation and death.

History
The Jozef Israëls painting is an Oil-on-canvas image which was completed in 1881. The painting was exhibited at the 1893 World's Columbian Exposition in Chicago Illinois.

Description
The painting has been called strong, beautiful and realistic. The scene is a portrayal of death and poverty. The broken-hearted man, and the face of the dead woman in the dull light of the room portray isolation and death. The image shows a man, wearing an overcoat, sitting on a chair by a bed. A woman is lying in the bed and the man is facing away from her. The man has a stern expression and woman appears to be ill.

Reception
French critic Louis Edmond Duranty said of the painting, "dombre et de douleur" or shadow and pain. H.C. Payne said of the scene in the painting, "...a scene, so entirely subordinate to its human meaning, and this is so profound and so clearly felt, that we do not think of the painting at all".

References

19th-century paintings
1880s paintings
Paintings about death
Paintings by Jozef Israëls